Democratic Party of Macedonians (DPM) is a political party in Serbia representing the Macedonian ethnic minority.

History 
Democratic Party of Macedonians was founded in 2004 with the purpose of defending the interests of Macedonians in Serbia. In 2020 Serbian parliamentary election, the party participated in the coalition with the Justice and Reconciliation Party, and its leader Muamer Zukorlić winning 1,00% managing to pass the national minorities census to enter the National Assembly.

Electoral history

Parliamentary elections

References

External links
Official website

Macedonian diaspora
Political parties of minorities in Serbia